Fanny Gelis (born 10 March 1977) is a French female rugby union player. She represented  at the 2002 Women's Rugby World Cup, finishing third. and 2006 Women's Rugby World Cup.

References

External links 

 fanny gelis Getty

1977 births
Living people
French female rugby union players